The 2016–17 Swazi Premier League season was the 2016–17 season of the top level of football competition in Swaziland. It began on 17 September 2016 and concluded on 25 May 2017.

Standings

References

Football leagues in Eswatini
Premier League
Premier League
Swaziland